Rhamnus taquetii, is a species of Rhamnus native to Jeju Island, South Korea. Growing on the slopes of Mt. Halla at elevations above 1200m, it is a bush reaching 1m. The anthraquinone physcion and the flavonoids kaempferol, rhamnocitrin, quercetin, and 3-O-methyl quercetin were isolated from its tissues.

References

taquetii
Endemic flora of South Korea
Plants described in 1912